is a city located in Hiroshima Prefecture, Japan, facing the Inland Sea. The city was founded on April 1, 1898. As of April 30, 2016, the city has an estimated population of 141,811 and a population density of 497.8 persons per km2. The total area is 284.85 km2.

It is well known for being featured in the 1953 film Tokyo Story, the 1960 film The Naked Island, and the 2016 video game Yakuza 6: The Song of Life.

History

 1168: The city's port opened and for the next 500 years served as a rice shipment center and port for all trades with foreign countries. Its commercial significance somewhat wavered during the Tokugawa period.
 1898: Onomichi Town in Mitsugi District becomes the second city in Hiroshima Prefecture.
 1935: The RMS Adriatic was scrapped in Onomichi.
 1937: The town of Kurihara and the village of Yoshiwa, both in Mitsugi District incorporated.
 1939: The village of Sanba from Numakuma District incorporated.
 1951: The village of Fukada from Mitsugi District incorporated.
 1954: Three villages from Mitsugi District incorporated.
 1955: Three villages from Numakuma District incorporated.
 1957: The village of Urasaki from Numakuma District incorporated.
 1970: The town of Mukaihigashi from Mitsugi District incorporated.
 March 28, 2005: The towns of Mitsugi and Mukaishima (both from Mitsugi District) were merged into Onomichi.
 January 10, 2006: The towns of Innoshima and Setoda (both from Toyota District) were merged into Onomichi.

Geography

Climate
Onomichi has a humid subtropical climate (Köppen climate classification Cfa) characterized by cool to mild winters and hot, humid summers.

Demographics
Per Japanese census data, the population of Onomichi in 2020 is 131,170 people. Onomichi has been conducting censuses since 1960.

Tourism
The city is known for its many temples such as the Buddhist Senkō-ji Temple (founded in the 9th century), has a shipbuilding yard and a motor factory. It offers a steamship service to ports of northern Shikoku and islands in the Inland Sea.

Temples
 Senkō-ji – Chūgoku 33 Kannon Pilgrimage No. 10
 Kōmyō-ji
 Tennei-ji
 Jōdo-ji  – Chūgoku 33 Kannon Pilgrimage No. 9
 Saigō-ji
 Saikoku-ji – Chūgoku 33 Kannon Pilgrimage
 Kongō-ji
 Kōsan-ji in Setoda, Hiroshima
 Kōjō-ji in Setoda – Chūgoku 33 Kannon Pilgrimage No.11
 Jikō-ji
 Kaifuku-ji
 Jōsen-ji
 Syōjyu-in
 Jikan-ji
 Myōsen-ji
 Taisan-ji

Shrines
 Misode-tenman-gū
 Ushitora Shrine – the oldest shrine in Onomichi
 Kubohachiman Shrine

Castles
 Innoshima Suigun Castle
 Onomichi Castle
 Fukuyama Domain Bansho Ato

Parks and gardens
 Senkoji Park on Mt. Senkoji – connected by Senkōji Ropeway from Onomichi Station
 Senkoji Park Green Land (1965–2007)
 Bingo Regional Sports Park
 Onomichi Shimanami Baseball Stadium – NPB game held twice a year as Hiroshima Carp home game.
 Mukaishima Orchid Center
 Innoshima Flower Center
 Citrus Park Setoda
 Innoshima Ohashi Memorial Park
 Mt. Takami National Park
 Tachibana Nature Village
 The Island's Blooms – The Pyrethrum
 Hyakka Park
 Souraiken Garden
 Mitsugi Greenland
 Marine Youth Center
 Mitsugi Softball Ballpark
 Chojabara Sports Center
 Mukaishima Sports Park
 Innoshima Sports Park
 Innoshima Amenity Pool
 Kaibutsu-en Ato (The remains of Kaibutsu-en) – The garden of the House of Tomishima (Tenmaya)

Museums
 Onomichi City Museum of Art
 Ikuo Hirayama Museum of Art – by named after Ikuo Hirayama
 Musee Nakata
 Onomichi Literature Museum
 Entsuba Katsuzo Sculpture Museum
 Honinbo Shusaku Igo Memorial Museum – by named after Honinbo Shusaku
 Museum of Setoda History and Folklore
 Onomichi Historical Museum
 Innoshima History Museum
 Island-Wide Art Museum
 Onomichi Motion Picture Museum

Beaches
 Shimanami Beach
 Ohamasaki Camp Site
 Setoda Sunset Beach
 Setoda B & G Marine Center
 Tachibana Beach
 Iwashijima Beach on Iwashijima Island

Hot springs
 Natural Spa Onomichi Fureai no Sato
 Mitsugi Yu Yu-Kan
 Harada-cho Yujin Hot spring
 Yoro onsen

Others
 Literature Path
 Nishiseto Expressway – "Shimanami Expressway" connects Onomichi and Imabari, Ehime 
 Innoshima Suigun Skyline
 Kaneyoshi Bus Stop
 Statue of Fumiko Hayashi
 Onomichi City Library
 Tsureshio Stone Monuments
 Shimanami Koryu-kan – "Teatro Shell-rune"
 Bel Canto Hall
 Crossroad Mitsugi

Festivals
 Onomichi Minato Matsuri – the Port Festival – April
 Onomichi Sumiyoshi Hanabi Matsuri – Fireworks – the last Sunday of July
 Innoshima Suigun Matsuri – at Suigun Castle – August
 Onomichi Betcha Matsuri – November 1–3

Economy

Manufacturing

Shipbuilding
 Naikai Shipbuilding
 Mukaishima Dock
 Onomichi Dockyard
 Universal Shipbuilding Onomichi dock
 Hitachi Zosen Corporation Onomichi dock
 JFE Shoji Trade Shipbuilding
 Tsuneishi Shipbuilding

Metalworking
 Press Kogyo
 Union Plate Onomichi plant

Chemistry
 Nitto Denko Onomichi plant
 Yokohama Rubber Company Onomichi plant

Agriculture
 Mikan, Grape, Juncus effusus, Scallion

Fishery
 Kamaboko, Stockfish, Tsukudani

Media
 Onomichi FM
 Onomichi Cable Television

Bookselling
 Keibunsha

Crime and safety
The Kyodo-kai yakuza syndicate is based in Onomichi. The Kyodo-kai is the second largest yakuza group in the Chugoku region after the Hiroshima-based Kyosei-kai.

In popular culture
The city is featured in the Japanese film Tokyo Story (1953) directed by Yasujirō Ozu. It is the setting for the fantasy 2005 anime series Kamichu! which faithfully depicts many of the city's features and landmarks. Events of the Blue Drop series also happen in this city.  It is also the setting of the romantic manga Pastel by Toshihiko Kobayashi.  The video game Yakuza 6: The Song of Life heavily features Onomichi as an in-game location, and its fictional mascot, Ono Michio.

Books
 A Dark Night's Passing (1921) by Naoya Shiga
 Diary of a Vagabond (1930) by Fumiko Hayashi
 The Accordion and the Fish Town (1931) by Fumiko Hayashi
 Akumyō (1961) by Toko Kon

Films
 Tokyo Story by Yasujirō Ozu (1953)
 Films by Kaneto Shindō
 Kanashimi wa onna dakeni (1958)
 The Naked Island (1960)
 Akumyō series by Tokuzo Tanaka, Kazuo Mori, Kimiyoshi Yasuda, Masahiro Makino, Yasuzo Masumura, Seiji Izumi (1961–2001)
 Nikui an-chikushô by Koreyoshi Kurahara (1962)
 Boy by Nagisa Oshima (1969)
 Films by Nobuhiko Obayashi
 Exchange Students (1982)
 The Little Girl Who Conquered Time (1983)
 Lonely Heart (1985)
 Chizuko's Younger Sister (1991)
 Goodbye for Tomorrow (1995)
 One Summer's Day (1999) 
 His Motorbike, Her Island (1986)
 Bound for the Fields, the Mountains, and the Seacoast (1986)
 The Stupid Teacher (1998)
 Yamato by Junya Sato (2005)

Drama
 Teppan (2010)

Manga
 Hikaru no Go (1998–2003)
 Parallel (2000–2002)
 Pastel (2002–2017)
 Shimanami Tasogare by Yuhki Kamatani (2015–2018)

Anime
 Kamichu! (2005–2007)
 Blue Drop (2007)

Video games
 Yakuza 6: The Song of Life (2016)
Between the Sky and Sea (2017–2019)

Notable people

Musicians
 Masami Shiratama
 Porno Graffitti

Go players
 Dogen Handa

TV
 Mona Yamamoto

Sports
 Hideto Tanihara
 Mariko Yoshida

Authors/artists
 Masami Teraoka
 Kiyotaka Haimura
 Ikuo Hirayama
 Kaiji Kawaguchi
 Nobuhiko Obayashi
 Genichiro Takahashi
 Katayama Bokuyō

Voice Actor
 Yoshimasa Hosoya

Sister cities
Onomichi has Sister City relationships with:
  Imabari, Ehime, Japan
  Higashiizumo, Shimane, Japan
  Chongqing, China
  Honfleur, France
  Glen Rock, New Jersey, United States

See also
 Senkō-ji (Onomichi)

References

External links

 Onomichi City official website 
 Onomichi City official website 
 Onomichi's Coordinator for International Relations website 

 
Cities in Hiroshima Prefecture
Port settlements in Japan
Populated coastal places in Japan